Mizuho Securities USA (“MSUSA”) is the US investment banking subsidiary of Mizuho Securities (“MHSC”).

Overview
MSUSA is an SEC-registered Broker-Dealer and a Primary Dealer of US Treasuries designated by the Federal Reserve Bank of New York.  MSUSA is also registered with the CFTC as a futures commission merchant (FCM)  and has memberships in, or access to, a variety of global futures exchanges for trading in financial and commodity futures and options on futures contracts. Since 2006 MSUSA’s business activities expanded to include the underwriting of debt and equity securities, and trading in ETFs, MBS and corporate bonds. Headquartered in  New York City, MSUSA has offices located in Boston, Chicago, Houston, Los Angeles, San Francisco New York City, Philadelphia, and Iselin.

Products and Services

Equity
MSUSA’s Equity Division provides equity research, capital markets access, and extensive equity and equity-linked distribution and execution capabilities for the equity markets in Asia and the Americas. MSUSA also has a Corporate Access desk that arranges numerous non-deal road shows. In 2010 MSUSA participated as Global Joint Coordinator on Dai-Ichi Life IPO, which was the largest IPO in Japan and 2nd largest globally for the year, and in the $6 billion Mizuho Financial Group global offering.

Fixed Income
MSUSA’s Fixed Income Division client relationship list includes central banks, banks, municipalities, hedge funds, asset managers and insurance corporations. MSUSA’s fixed income products include: US Treasuries, corporate bonds, Debt Capital Markets, US Agency Securities, Securities Financing, Strategic Credit Group, mortgage- and asset-backed securities, Japanese Government Bonds, Yen Fixed Income, Emerging Markets

Futures
MSUSA’s Futures Division provides futures clearing and execution services across a spectrum of institutional clients. MSUSA provides market coverage through Electronic Execution Services, Clearing Services and Voice Execution Services.

Investment Banking
MSUSA provides investment banking services through its Bridgeford division. The Bridgeford Group provides advisory services to Japanese and US multi-national corporations, offering services of mergers & acquisitions, financial structuring, and corporate strategy with expertise in cross-border transactions.

Leadership 

Jerry Rizzieri is President and CEO of Mizuho Securities USA.

References

External links 
 Mizuho Americas (Mizuho Securities USA Inc.)
 Mizuho Financial Group
 Mizuho Securities
 Mizuho Bank

Financial services companies based in New York City
Financial services companies established in 2000
Banks established in 2000
2000 establishments in New York City
American subsidiaries of foreign companies
Securities USA